774 Armor is a minor planet orbiting the Sun in the main belt. It was discovered on December 13, 1913, in Paris by French astronomer Charles le Morvan and was named after the Celtic region of Armorica. The orbital plane is inclined by an angle of 5.56° to the plane of the ecliptic.

In the SMASS-I taxonomy, this is classified as an S-type asteroid. It spans a girth of approximately 50 km. The rotation of this asteroid is commensurate with the length of an Earth day, requiring measurements from more than one latitude for full coverage. This is consistent with the results of an earlier study in 2006.

References

External links 
 Lightcurve plot of 774 Armor, Palmer Divide Observatory, B. D. Warner (2006)
 Asteroid Lightcurve Database (LCDB), query form (info )
 Dictionary of Minor Planet Names, Google books
 Asteroids and comets rotation curves, CdR – Observatoire de Genève, Raoul Behrend
 Discovery Circumstances: Numbered Minor Planets (1)-(5000) – Minor Planet Center
 
 

S-type asteroids (SMASS)
000774
Discoveries by C. le Morvan
Named minor planets
19131219
Armorica